Chickanele Michael Elechi (born 10 October 2001) is an English professional footballer who plays as a defender for Leatherhead.

Career
Born in Westminster, Elechi started his youth career at Manchester United, joining their academy in 2016, but was released in 2018. He subsequently joined Oxford United and signed his first professional contract with them in December 2018, lasting until summer 2021. 

On 1 February 2020, Elechi joined Southern League Premier Division South side Gosport Borough on a one-month loan deal. On 3 March 2020, the loan spell was extended by a further month. 

He made his debut for Oxford United on 6 October 2020 in a 1–1 EFL Trophy draw with Bristol Rovers, in which Oxford won the resultant penalty shoot-out. 

On 5 February 2021, Elechi joined National League South side Oxford City on a one-month loan, with an option to extend to the end of the season. He made 2 league appearances on loan at Oxford City, before the Coronavirus pandemic curtailed the season. On 9 September 2021, Elechi returned to the National League South, joining Chippenham Town on an initial one-month loan. In November of the same year he was loaned to Southern League Premier Division South side Salisbury for a month. On 14 December 2021, his loan spell at Salisbury was extended by a further month. Elechi was released by Oxford at the end of the 2021–22 season.

On 21 October 2022, Elechi signed for Isthmian League South Central Division club Leatherhead.

Personal life
Born in England, Elechi is of Nigerian descent.

References

External links

Living people
2001 births
Footballers from Westminster
English footballers
English people of Nigerian descent
Association football defenders
Oxford United F.C. players
Gosport Borough F.C. players
Oxford City F.C. players
Chippenham Town F.C. players
Salisbury F.C. players
Leatherhead F.C. players
National League (English football) players
Southern Football League players
Isthmian League players
Black British sportsmen